The Consolidated Appropriations Act of 2017, also known as the 2017 omnibus spending bill, is a United States appropriations legislation passed during the 115th Congress. It provides spending permission to several federal agencies for fiscal year 2017, and it authorizes $1.1 trillion in spending.

Provisions

The Consolidated Appropriations Act, 2017 authorized $100 million for the "Countering Russian Influence Fund", to counter "Russian influence and aggression" and to "support civil society organizations in Europe and Eurasia." It also included a measure imposing new restrictions and oversight on Russian diplomats in the United States.

The Act also includes provisions that no appropriated funds may be used to support the Russian annexation of Crimea and assist Crimea, if such assistance includes the participation of Russian Government officials, or other Russian owned or controlled financial entities. It also states that no funds may be used to support "the Russian occupation of the Georgian territories of Abkhazia and Tskhinvali Region/South Ossetia" or to assist the central governments of other countries that have recognized the two territories' independence.

Key Factors 

 The act provided $8.1 billion in emergency funding for Hurricane Harvey and Hurricane Irma disaster relief efforts.
 The act included supples focused at preventing the spread of the Zika virus and providing funding for the fight against opioid abuse.

References

External links
 Consolidated Appropriations Act, 2017 as amended (PDF/details) in the GPO Statute Compilations collection
 Consolidated Appropriations Act, 2017 as enacted (PDF/details) in the US Statutes at Large

United States federal appropriations legislation
Acts of the 115th United States Congress
Georgia (country)–United States relations
Abkhazia–United States relations
South Ossetia–United States relations